Trumann High School is a comprehensive public high school located in the rural community of Trumann, Arkansas, United States. The school provides secondary education for students in grades 9 through 12. It is one of five public high schools in Poinsett County, Arkansas and the sole high school administered by the Trumann School District.

Academics 
Trumann High School is accredited by the Arkansas Department of Education (ADE) and since 1963 by AdvancED. The assumed course of study follows the Smart Core curriculum developed by the ADE, which requires students complete at least 22 units prior to graduation. Students complete regular coursework and exams and may take Advanced Placement (AP) courses and exam with the opportunity to receive college credit.

Extracurricular activities 
The Trumann High School mascot and athletic emblem is the Wildcat with black and old gold serving as the school colors.

Athletics 
For 2012–14, the Trumann Wildcats compete in interscholastic activities within the 4A Classification via the 4A Region 3 Conference, as administered by the Arkansas Activities Association. The Wildcats field teams in football, golf (boys/girls), bowling (boys/girls), basketball (boys/girls), track and field (boys/girls), baseball, fastpitch softball, and competitive cheer.

Notable people 
The following are notable people associated with Trumann High School. If the person was a Trumann High School student, the number in parentheses indicates the year of graduation; if the person was a faculty or staff member, that person's title and years of association are included.

 Elbert Shelley—NFL professional football player.

References

External links 
 

Public high schools in Arkansas
Schools in Poinsett County, Arkansas
School buildings completed in 2009
2009 establishments in Arkansas